The 2003 Samsung-PBA All-Filipino Cup Finals was the best-of-7 basketball championship series of the 2003 PBA All-Filipino Cup and the conclusion of the conference's playoffs. The Talk 'N Text Phone Pals and Coca Cola Tigers played for the 84th championship contested by the league.

Talk 'N Text Phone Pals overcame a 0–2 overhaul and wins their first-ever PBA title in 13 years, (not counting the 1998 PBA Centennial Cup) winning four straight over the defending champions Coca Cola Tigers in a 4–2 series victory.

Series scoring summary

Games summary

Game 1

Down by 17 at 46–63, the Phone Pals came back to trailed within five at 64–69 as Asi Taulava and Felix Belano starred in a key run stretch, but Coca Cola stopped the Talk 'N Text rally with Jeffrey Cariaso hitting 13 of his 19 points in the fourth quarter.

Game 2

Game 3

Bong Ravena drained a short jumper and converted two pressure-packed free throws that neutralized a comeback by the Tigers. Both teams fared poorly from the perimeter.

Game 4

Game 5

Talk 'N Text came back from a 9-point deficit midway in the final quarter, a triple by Bong Ravena tied the game at 79-all, Asi Taulava shoved the Phone Pals ahead with two free throws, 81–79, with 32 seconds to go, Ato Morano's twisting layup with 20 seconds left tied the count at 81-all, the game went into overtime after Morano's potential game-winner rimmed out at the buzzer. In the extension period, the Tigers took an 87–81 advantage on Johnny Abarrientos' back-to-back jumpers and assist, a 13–2 run by the Phone Pals bucked a sizzling Coca Cola start in overtime, clutch hits by Victor Pablo and Patrick Fran gave Talk 'N Text a 94–89 lead.

Game 6

The Tigers led by as many as 14 points before the Phone Pals tied the game for the first time at 58-all early in the last quarter, Coca Cola led for the last time at 71–68 when a three-pointer by Bong Ravena tied the count, Asi Taulava broke the deadlock with a short jumper and then Jimmy Alapag unloaded another triple after a free throw by Ato Morano as Talk 'N Text opened up a 76–72 lead in the last 43 seconds, two free throws by Johnny Abarrientos followed by two charity misses by Taulava and another free throw by Rudy Hatfield pulled the Tigers within one, 75–76, with 29 seconds to go, Taulava finally made his second free throw with 13 seconds left and Ravena contributed another to seal the win, 78–75, after Morano missed a hurried three-point attempt.

Rosters

Broadcast notes

References

External links
 PBA.ph

2003
2003 PBA season
TNT Tropang Giga games
Powerade Tigers games
PBA All-Filipino Cup Finals